LHR may refer to:

 Heathrow Airport (IATA code), England, UK
 Lambert, Hendricks & Ross, an American vocal jazz trio
 Lite Hash Rate, an anti-cryptocurrency-mining technology in the 2021 GPU GeForce 30 series
 Light Horse Regiment, an armoured regiment of the South African Army
 Long homologous repeats, genetic sequences
 Luteinizing hormone receptor, a transmembrane receptor in reproductive tissues
 Lung-to-head ratio, a factor in the treatment of congenital diaphragmatic hernia

See also
 L&HR (disambiguation)